The 2015 season was BK Häcken's 75th in existence, their 15th season in Allsvenskan and their seventh consecutive season in the league. They competed in Allsvenskan where they finished seventh and in Svenska Cupen where they were knocked out in the semi-finals.

Players

Squad information

Competitions

Allsvenskan

League table

Results summary

Results by round

References

BK Häcken seasons
BK Hacken